Zhu Zhixin is the name of:

Zhu Zhixin (revolutionary) (1885–1920), Tongmenghui revolutionary and writer
Zhu Zhixin (politician) (born 1949), People's Republic of China politician and economic official